Negroponte may refer to:

Places
 Chalkis, capital of Euboea, Greece
 Euboea, a Greek island of which Chalkis is the capital
 Lordship of Negroponte, crusader state established on the island after the Fourth Crusade

Persons
 Fra Antonio da Negroponte (16th century), Italian painter of the early-Renaissance period
 Diana Villiers Negroponte (born 1947), American trade lawyer
 John Negroponte (born 1939), diplomat and Deputy Secretary of State
 Nicholas Negroponte (born 1943), architect and founder of the MIT Media Lab

Other uses
 Bailo of Negroponte, the representative of the Republic of Venice at Chalcis, Greece

See also
 Black Bridge (disambiguation)
 Ponte (disambiguation)
 Siege of Negroponte (disambiguation)
 White Bridge (disambiguation)
 Whitebridge (disambiguation)